The Switzerland national under-17 football team is the national under-17 football team of Switzerland and is controlled by the Swiss Football Association. The team competes in the UEFA European Under-17 Championship and in the FIFA U-17 World Cup. The biggest success was the win of the World Cup in 2009 in Nigeria.

Competitive record

FIFA U-17 World Cup Record

UEFA European U-17 Football Championship Record

*Denotes draws include knockout matches decided on penalty kicks.
 Gold background color indicates first-place finish. Silver background color indicates second-place finish. Bronze background color indicates third-place finish

Recent results

2021

Current squad 
 The following players were called up for the 2023 UEFA European Under-17 Championship qualification.
 Match dates: 13–19 October 2022
 Opposition: ,  and 
Caps and goals correct as of: 13 October 2022, after the match against

References

Swiss national teams
 Switzerland men's national football team
 Switzerland men's national under-23 football team (also known as Swiss Olympic)
 Switzerland men's national under-21 football team
 Switzerland men's national under-20 football team
 Switzerland men's national under-19 football team
 Switzerland men's national under-18 football team
 Switzerland men's national under-16 football team
 Switzerland women's national football team
 Switzerland women's national under-17 football team
 Switzerland women's national beach soccer team

See also
 European Under-17 Football Championship
 Under-17 World Cup

European national under-17 association football teams
F